Erik Bjornsen (born July 14, 1991) is an American cross-country skier. He competed at the 2014 Winter Olympics in Sochi in the 30 kilometre skiathlon and sprint, and at the 2018 Winter Olympics in PyeongChang, South Korea, in men's 30 km skiathon and 15 km freestyle.

Bjornsen debuted in the World Cup in December 2012. His best result in a World Cup race was third place in a 15 km pursuit race in Lillehammer, Norway in December, 2018.

He announced his retirement from cross-country skiing in April, 2020.

His sister Sadie Maubet Bjornsen is a former cross-country skier on the United States Ski Team.

Cross-country skiing results
All results are sourced from the International Ski Federation (FIS).

Olympic Games

World Championships

World Cup

Season standings

Individual podiums
1 podium – (1 )

References

External links
 
 
 
 

1991 births
Cross-country skiers at the 2014 Winter Olympics
Living people
Olympic cross-country skiers of the United States
American male cross-country skiers
Sportspeople from Washington (state)
People from Okanogan County, Washington
Cross-country skiers at the 2018 Winter Olympics